Jacob Samuel (born Jacob Fox) is a Canadian stand-up comedian from Vancouver, British Columbia. He is most noted for his 2020 comedy album Horse Power, which won the Juno Award for Comedy Album of the Year at the Juno Awards of 2021.

He regularly appears on the CBC Radio comedy series The Debaters, and appeared in the 2020 web series The New Wave of Standup.

In addition to his stand-up comedy work Samuel is also a cartoonist, whose work has appeared in various magazines including The New Yorker.

References

21st-century Canadian comedians
Canadian male comedians
Canadian stand-up comedians
Canadian cartoonists
Artists from Vancouver
Comedians from Vancouver
Jewish Canadian artists
Jewish Canadian comedians
Living people
Juno Award for Comedy Album of the Year winners
Year of birth missing (living people)